Union Eagle Ltd v Golden Achievement Ltd [1997] UKPC 5 is an English contract law case, concerning the right to terminate performance of a contract.

Facts
Union Eagle paid 10% of the HK$4.2m price for a Hong Kong flat as a deposit. Time was said to be ‘of the essence’. Completion was meant to be 5pm 30 September 1991, and clause 12 said failure to complete meant the deposit was forfeit and the agreement rescinded. They were 10 minutes late. Union Eagle sued for specific performance, arguing relying on such a legal right was unconscionable.

Advice
Lord Hoffmann for the Privy Council advised that certainty was needed in the business world, particularly in a volatile market. Accordingly, the contract's terms should be strictly enforced, and Union Eagle lost its deposit.

See also

English contract law

Notes

References

English contract case law
Real estate in Hong Kong
Judicial Committee of the Privy Council cases on appeal from Hong Kong
1997 in case law
1997 in British law
1997 in Hong Kong